Mile End station may refer to:

United Kingdom
Mile End tube station, an underground station in London
Mile End railway station (London), a disused railway station in London

Australia
Mile End railway station, Adelaide, South Australia
Mile End Goods railway station, Adelaide, South Australia